Leo Young Jr (born 12 February 1969 in Victoria) is an Australian professional light middle/middleweight boxer of the 1990s who won the Victoria (Australia) State light middleweight title, Victoria (Australia) State middleweight title, Australian light middleweight title, and Commonwealth light middleweight title (twice), his professional fighting weight varied from , i.e. light middleweight to , i.e. middleweight.

Professional boxing record

References

External links

1969 births
Light-middleweight boxers
Living people
Middleweight boxers
Boxers from Melbourne
Australian male boxers
Commonwealth Boxing Council champions